Neil Linpow is a multi-award-winning English actor, writer and filmmaker.

Biography

Early life and career

Neil grew up in Bournemouth and was a talented football player having played at schoolboy level for both Bournemouth and Portsmouth. He has produced work for acclaimed directors including Michel Gondry, Michael Gracey, Colm McCarthy, Sam Miller and Bobby Farrelly.

Screen work

In 2019 Neil wrote, directed, produced and starred in the award-winning short film 'Time.' Amongst its festival awards and selections, it was an Official Selection at the BAFTA qualifying 39th Cambridge Film Festival and nominated for Best Film and Best Performance awards at the Kinsale Sharks Awards.
His follow up short, 'Lesson 7,' starring Michelle Fairley, was released in 2020, winning awards across multiple festivals for its dark and suspenseful narrative, and Linpow's direction. It was an Official Selection at the BAFTA qualifying 11th Aesthetica Short Film Festival and at the Oscar and BAFTA qualifying Rhode Island International Film Festival in 2021.

In 2023, Neil wrote and starred in the psychological thriller, Little Bone Lodge, starring alongside Joely Richardson, and directed by Matthias Hoene for Tea Shop Films and Warner Bros. The film premiered at the 19th Glasgow Film Festival as part of the Frightfest strand. It opened to strong critical reviews that praised the performances and twisting nature of the screenplay.

Filmography

References
https://www.eyeforfilm.co.uk/review/little-bone-lodge-2023-film-review-by-jennie-kermode
https://www.thehollywoodnews.com/2023/03/11/little-bone-lodge-review-dir-matthias-hoene-frightfest-glasgow/
https://movingpicturesfilmclub.com/2023/03/11/review-little-bone-lodge-2023/
https://johnnyalucard.com/2023/03/11/frightfest-review-little-bone-lodge/
https://bloody-flicks.co.uk/2023/03/12/little-bone-lodge-glasgow-frightfest-review/
https://www.shots.net/news/view/how-neil-linpow-learnt-his-lesson
https://shots.net/news/view/do-you-have-time-for-this-cell-phone-call
https://www.davidreviews.tv/Work/Short_Films_Lesson_7/
https://www.davidreviews.tv/Work/Short_Films_Time/
https://www.lbbonline.com/news/lbb-film-club-time
https://www.ukfilmreview.co.uk/post/time-short-film-review
https://www.beyondtheshort.com/watch/lesson-7-neil-linpow
https://www.ukfilmreview.co.uk/post/lesson-7-short-film-review
https://filmshortage.com/dailyshortpicks/lesson-7/
https://www.screendaily.com/news/sc-films-acquires-crime-thriller-little-bone-lodge-starring-joely-richardson-releases-first-look-exclusive/5169957.article
https://www.davidreviews.com/Work/2022/Short_Films_SmashGrab/
https://www.shots.net/news/view/neil-linpows-smashing-short

External links

Living people
English male film actors
English male stage actors
Mass media people from Bournemouth
Year of birth missing (living people)